Kemerkaya may refer to:

Kemerkaya, Adıyaman, Turkey
Kemerkaya, Bolvadin, Turkey
Kemerkaya, Kemah
Kemerkaya, Oltu
Kəmərqaya, Azerbaijan